Sylvia Watson is a former Canadian politician.  She was a Toronto City Councillor for Ward 14 Parkdale-High Park from 2003 to 2006 and the candidate for the Ontario Liberal Party in the 2006 by-election and in the 2007 general election.

Background
Watson and her family immigrated to Canada when she was a child as displaced person from Austria  following World War II.  The family settled in Toronto.

She studied at York University and Osgoode Law School and was called to the bar in 1981. She became corporate counsel for  Wellesley Hospital in 1986. In 1991 she was hired by the City of Toronto where she performed a number of roles including director of litigation and city solicitor.

Municipal politics
In 2003, Watson ran for city council in (Ward 14), Parkdale–High Park to replace retiring councillor Chris Korwin-Kuczynski. Even though she didn't live in the ward, she was known for participating in an affordable housing initiative called the Parkdale Pilot Project. She beat her nearest rival, Ed Zielinski (who was endorsed by Korwin-Kuczynski) by 3,988 votes.

During her three years as councillor, she chaired the Administration Committee, and served as vice-chair of the Budget Advisory Committee.

Provincial politics

By-election, 2006
On June 27, 2006, Watson announced that she would run in a provincial by-election to replace Gerrard Kennedy who was moving on to federal politics. Watson based her campaign on the Liberal government's record of investing in education and health care but acknowledged that she was in a tight race considering that the provincial riding encompassed only half her former city riding.

The campaign became contentious when the Liberals issued a press release claiming that NDP rival, United Church minister Cheri DiNovo had compared the media treatment of Karla Homolka as "comparable to the persecution of Jesus Christ."

DiNovo won the election by 2,288 votes.

Provincial general election, 2007

On May 11, 2007, the Liberals nominated Watson to stand again as their candidate in Parkdale—High Park for the 2007 Ontario election. She was again defeated by DiNovo, this time by an increased margin.

After politics
As of 2011, Watson is employed as an adjudicator for the provincial Landlord and Tenant Board.

Electoral record
	

2003 Toronto Election, Ward 14,

References

External links
City of Toronto councillor biography (archived)

Living people
Ontario Liberal Party candidates in Ontario provincial elections
Toronto city councillors
Women in Ontario politics
Women municipal councillors in Canada
Year of birth missing (living people)